Chevelon Butte School District 5  is a school district in Coconino County, Arizona.

References

External links
 

School districts in Coconino County, Arizona